Peter Lindseth is Olimpiad S. Ioffe Professor of International and Comparative Law, at University of Connecticut.
He is the recipient of the 2012 Daimler Berlin Prize and is a Fellow at the American Academy in Berlin.

Life
He graduated from  Cornell University with a B.A. and J.D., and from Columbia University with a Ph.D.

He was a Visiting Professor at Princeton University, and Yale University.

Works
 Power and Legitimacy: Reconciling Europe and the Nation-State, Oxford University Press, 2010, 

 Administrative Law of the European Union: Oversight, with Alfred C. Aman and Alan C. Raul; George Bermann, et al., series eds.; ABA Publishing 2008, 
 Transatlantic Regulatory Cooperation: Legal Problems and Political Prospects, co-editor with George Bermann and Matthias Herdegen; Oxford University Press 2000
"Agents Without Principals?: Delegation in an Age of Diffuse and Fragmented Governance", in Reframing Self-Regulation in European Private Law, Fabrizio Cafaggi, ed.; Kluwer Law International, 2006

References

External links
http://opiniojuris.org/2011/04/29/peter-lindseth-and-the-concept-of-legitimacy/

American lawyers
University of Connecticut faculty
Cornell University alumni
Columbia University faculty
Living people
Year of birth missing (living people)